Adjustable focus eyeglasses are eyeglasses with an adjustable focal length.  They compensate for refractive errors (such as presbyopia) by providing variable focusing, allowing users to adjust them for desired distance or prescription, or both.

Current bifocals and progressive lenses are static, in that the user has to change their eye position to look through the portion of the lens with the focal power corresponding to the distance of the object. This usually means looking through the top of the lens for distant objects and down through the bottom of the lens for near objects.  Adjustable focus eyeglasses have one focal length, but it is variable without having to change where one is looking.

Possible uses for such glasses are to provide inexpensive eyeglasses for people from low-income groups, developing countries, third world countries or to accommodate for presbyopia.

Methods 
There are currently two basic methods to achieve variable focal length: electro-optical and opto-mechanical.

Electro-optical often uses liquid crystals as the active medium.  Applying an electric potential to the liquid changes the refraction of the liquid.

Early work on opto-mechanical methods was done by Martin Wright.  Opto-mechanical spectacles allow focus control by the wearer via movement of a small slider located on top of the bridge.  The user adjusts the lens for optical clarity at the desired distance.  They are a combination of rigid and flexible lenses that can change prescription to enable sharp focus at different distances (from infinity up to 13"). The appropriate addition range depends on the user's level of refractive error.  A tiny mechanism, actuated by the slider, simultaneously controls both flexible lenses to assure appropriate near vision tracking in both eyes.

Another type of opto-mechanical lens is the design of Joshua Silver, and uses liquid pressure against a diaphragm to control focus of a lens. These lenses were meant to provide improved vision without prescription by an optometrist, since these professionals are in short supply in many countries. Each eyepiece encloses a reservoir of fluid silicone and the user adjusts the level of fluid with a dial until they are satisfied with the result.

Stephen Kurtin also had a product based on what appears to be a related design called Superfocus (originally TruFocals). This company has since gone bankrupt.

Advantages
Unlike with bifocals, near-vision correction is achieved over the entire field of view, in any direction.  Distance vision corrections are made by re-adjusting the lens for distance, instead of by tilting and/or rotating the head to view object through the best part of the lens for the distance.  Adjustable focus lenses, like single-focus lenses, also reduce image-jump and spatial distortion in the field of view associated with traditional multi-focal lenses.  Additionally, the ideal near-vision correction can be achieved with precision, because the variable lenses emulate the focusing action of the youthful (non-presbyopic) eye.

Disadvantages 
The focal distance is changed by a mechanism located on the glasses, requiring periodic adjustment as the user switches his gaze to nearer or farther objects.

See also
 Intraocular lens "CrystaLens" replaces the normal eye lens with an adjustable one that is adjusted by using the eye's focusing muscles to focus.
 Electrowetting is a technology used to electrically adjust the path of light

References

Further reading

 "Progressive Addition Lenses: History, Design, Wearer Satisfaction and Trends" Pope, D R OSA TOPS Vol. 35, Vision Science and Its Applications, 2000
 "Presbyopia: prevalence, impact, and interventions". Patel I, West SK. Community Eye Health. 2007 Sep;20(63):40–1
 "Tolerance to prism induced by readymade spectacles" du Toit R, Ramke J, Brian G Optom Vis Sci. 2007 Nov;84(11):1053–9
 "The mechanics of accommodation in relation to presbyopia" Fisher RF Eye. 1988;2 ( Pt 6):646–9.
 "Effects of interocular blur suppression ability on monovision task performance" Schor C, Carson M, Peterson G, Suzuki J, Erickson P J Am Optom Assoc. 1989 Mar;60(3):188–92
 "Visual acuity and optical parameters in progressive-power lenses" Villegas EA, Artal P Optom Vis Sci. 2006 Sep;83(9):672–81
 "Are all aberrations equal?" Applegate RA, Sarver EJ, Khemsara V J Refract Surg. 2002 Sep-Oct;18(5):S556–62
 "A population study on changes in wave aberrations with accommodation" Cheng H, Barnett JK, Vilupuru AS, J Vis. 2004 Apr 16;4(4):272–80
 "The optics of occupational progressive lenses" Sheedy JE, Hardy RF Optometry. 2005 Aug;76(8):432–41
 "Progressive addition lenses—matching the specific lens to patient needs". Sheedy JE. Optometry. 2004 Feb;75(2):83–102.
 "Progressive addition lenses—measurements and ratings". Sheedy J, Hardy RF, Hayes JR Optometry. 2006 Jan;77(1):23–39
 "Progressive powered lenses: the Minkwitz theorem" Sheedy JE, Campbell C, Optom Vis Sci. 2005 Oct;82(10):916–22
 "Correlation analysis of the optics of progressive addition lenses" Sheedy JE Optom Vis Sci. 2004 May;81(5):350–61
 "Will visual discomfort among visual display unit (VDU)" Horgen G, Aarås A, Thoresen M. Optom Vis Sci. 2004 May;81(5):341–9
 "Comparative investigations of progressive lenses" Diepes H, Tameling A. Am J Optom Physiol Opt. 1988 Jul;65(7):571–9.
 "Compensating presbyopia: a new physiological progressive lens" McGarry MB, Manning TM. Ophthalmic Physiol Opt. 2003 Jan;23(1):13–20
 "The advantages and disadvantages of bifocal lenses" Zanen A Bull Soc Belge Ophtalmol. 1997;264:71–8
 "Contraindications of multifocal lenses and progressive lenses" Bourgeois R. Bull Soc Belge Ophtalmol. 1997;264:87–96
 "The correction and management of ametropia in older patients" David B Elliott PhD, MCOptom, FAAO Investigative Ophthalmology and Visual Science. 2004;45:2122–2128.)
 Stepping Up to a New Level: Effects of Blurring Vision in the Elderly Heasley K, Buckley J G, Elliott D B
 "Monovision: a review" Evans BJ Ophthalmic Physiol Opt. 2007 Sep;27(5):417–39

Corrective lenses
Eyewear